The NWA Women's Television Championship is a women's professional wrestling championship owned and promoted by the American professional wrestling promotion National Wrestling Alliance (NWA). It will be the secondary championship of the promotion's female division.

History
On the July 26, 2022 episode of NWA's weekly flagship program, NWA Powerrr, Madusa announced they were introducing the NWA Women's Television Championship. On the February 14, 2023 episode of NWA Powerrr, NWA introduced the title for the women's division with a tournament to determine the inaugural holder of the championship at their next PPV, NWA 312, on April 7. Like the NWA World Television Championship, it will use "Lucky Seven Rule". A champion who successfully defends the championship 7 consecutive times will be eligible to trade in the championship for a match for the NWA World Women's Championship.

Inaugural tournament

See also
 NWA World Women's Championship
 NWA World Women's Tag Team Championship

References

External links

National Wrestling Alliance championships
Television wrestling championships
2022 establishments in the United States
2022 introductions
Women's professional wrestling championships